Has the World Gone Mad! is a lost 1923 American silent  society drama film produced by Daniel Carson Goodman and distributed through Equity Pictures. Goodman also created the story and wrote the screenplay. It was directed by J. Searle Dawley.

Cast
Mary Alden - Mrs. Bell
Vincent Coleman - Their Son
Robert Edeson - Mr. Adams
Elinor Fair - Their Daughter
Hedda Hopper - Mrs. Adams
Lyda Lola - Cabaret Dancer
Charles Richman - Mr. Bell

References

External links
 
 

1923 films
1923 drama films
Silent American drama films
Lost American films
American silent feature films
American black-and-white films
Films directed by J. Searle Dawley
Films based on short fiction
1923 lost films
Lost drama films
1920s American films